The British automobile manufacturer Lotus Cars, currently a subsidiary of Geely, has produced a number of race and production cars since its inception in 1948.

Current production vehicles

Former production vehicles

Concept cars

Other vehicles with Lotus development

See also 

 Lotus Cars, the manufacturer of these models
 Lotus F1 and Team Lotus, motorsport ventures of the company

References

Lotus vehicles